Pierre Elliott Trudeau (1919–2000) was the fifteenth Prime Minister of Canada.

Pierre Elliott Trudeau may also refer to:
Montréal–Pierre Elliott Trudeau International Airport in Montreal, Canada
Mount Pierre Elliott Trudeau in the Cariboo region of British Columbia, Canada
École élémentaire Pierre-Elliott-Trudeau in Toronto, Canada
Pierre Elliott Trudeau Elementary School in Vancouver, Canada
Pierre Elliott Trudeau Elementary School (Hull, Quebec) in Gatineau, Quebec, Canada
Pierre Elliott Trudeau High School in Markham, Ontario, Canada
Collège Pierre-Elliott-Trudeau high school in Winnipeg, Canada
Pierre Elliott Trudeau Foundation, a Canadian charity

See also
 Trudeaumania, the idol worship phenomenon relating to the 15th PM of Canada.
 Trudeau family, the Canadian political family of Pierre Elliott Trudeau
 Trudeau, biographical 2002 television miniseries on Pierre Elliott Trudeau
 Trudeau (disambiguation)
 Elliot (disambiguation)
 Pierre (disambiguation)